"The Spaniard That Blighted My Life" is a comic song which was composed and first performed by English music-hall performer Billy Merson.

It starts

It was performed by Al Jolson in his show The Honeymoon Express and he recorded it for Victor Records on March 7, 1913 (catalog No. 17318). It became a major hit, selling over a million copies.

Merson sued Jolson for copyright infringement, forcing removal of the song from the movie, The Singing Fool in the UK.

Renditions 
 Al Jolson, The Jolson Story (1946) and Jolson Sings Again (performed by Larry Parks), dubbed by Al Jolson)
 Bing Crosby and Al Jolson, recorded March 25, 1947. 
 Roy Hudd on Those Music Hall Days Seamus Kennedy on Party Pieces'', 2005.
 The song was featured in Season 32, Episode 1 of The Simpsons.

References

External links 
 Parlour Songs article on Al Jolson

Comedy songs
1911 songs
Al Jolson songs
Music hall songs
Songs about Spain